McConnelsville is an unincorporated community in Wayne Township, Jefferson County, in the U.S. State of Ohio. The precise location is unknown to GNIS.

History
McConnelsville was laid out in 1816 by Joseph McConnell. It was located near Fernwood, but no residents ever came.

References

Geography of Jefferson County, Ohio
Unincorporated communities in Jefferson County, Ohio